The Jeep Patriot (MK74) is a front-engine five-door compact crossover SUV manufactured and marketed by Jeep, having debuted with the Jeep Compass in April 2006 at the New York Auto Show for the 2007 model year. Both cars, as well as Dodge Caliber shared the GS platform, differentiated by their styling and marketing, with the Patriot exclusively offering a four-wheel drive system, marketed as Freedom Drive II.

The Patriot was manufactured at Chrysler's Belvidere, Illinois assembly plant alongside the Compass. Although the model was still selling well even as it was essentially unchanged as it entered its 11th model year, production ended with the 2017 model year.

Design

In the U.S. the Patriot uses either the 2.0 L or 2.4 L World gasoline I4 engine. Both front-wheel drive and four-wheel drive are available. The Patriot features two four-wheel drive systems both of which are electronically controlled. The basic four-wheel drive system is called Freedom Drive I. This system is a full-time front-wheel-drive based 4WD/AWD system that is front-wheel-drive when it has traction, but can automatically put up to 50% power to the rear wheels, the ECC (Electronically controlled clutch located on the rear differential) can be locked in 50–50 below a certain speed. This "locking" isn't a true lock and just requests the ECC be locked more than in the regular AWD mode.  The ECC clutch is pulsed during turns to avoid the system from binding the drivetrain. The other system, called Freedom Drive II, is based on Freedom Drive I, but by using the vehicle's CVT transmission it is capable of a 19:1 gear reduction simulating a low range usually found in vehicles with dedicated transfer cases.  This 19:1 "crawl" ratio is achieved with a much lower (numerically higher) rear differential gear compared to non Freedom Drive II vehicles.  The 2.4 L GEMA I4 is an option for the 4X2 model Patriot.

For Europe and Australia, a 2.0 L (1968 cc; 120 cid; 140ps) Volkswagen-manufactured diesel engine is fitted along with a 6-speed manual gearbox. All EU cars are fitted as standard with four wheel drive and a version of the Freedom Drive System that tuned differently from the U.S. versions, but with similar capability to FDII with brake traction control and three switchable electronic stability control and traction control settings for on or off-road use.

The Patriot won the 2007 Green 4x4 Award and the 2008 4x4 of the Year in the UK.

The Patriot uses a continuously variable transmission equipped with a four wheel drive system, marketed as Freedom Drive II, capable of holding the lowest ratio the CVT can reach, in lieu of a traditional two-speed transfer case. The Patriot carries Jeep's "Trail Rated" badging.

Models
The Patriot was offered in three basic models with several additional options available:

Sport:
-Manual roll-up windows and manual door locks
-Vinyl-wrapped steering wheel and dual-note horn
-Cruise control (not all years)
-Anti-theft ignition
-Vinyl (later cloth) seating surfaces
-Manualy adjustable front bucket seats
-Folding rear bench seat
-2.0 L I4 engine (4X2) or 2.4 L I4 engine (4X4) or 2.0 CRD (VW) 4x2, 4x4 or 2.1 CRD (Mercedes-Benz) 4x4
-5-speed manual transmission
-Tinted windows
-16-inch all-season tires
-16-inch styled steel wheels
-AM/FM stereo w/ single-disc CD player (later CD-MP3 player) and four speakers

Latitude:
-Power windows with one-touch driver's auto down feature and power door locks 
-SIRIUS-XM satellite radio (optional accessory)
-Leather-wrapped steering wheel
-Keyless entry with panic feature and security system
-Cloth Seating Surfaces
-Air conditioning with manual controls
-17-inch all-season tires
-17-inch alloy wheels
-Rear dome light flashlight

Limited:
-Cloth (later leather) seating surfaces
-Power front driver's seat
-Power sunroof
-U Connect hands-free Bluetooth telephone system

High Altitude

All of the above
Leather seats
Heated 
Touchscreen Bluetooth
Subwoofer
5 speed manual

Electric version
At the 2009 North American International Auto Show in Detroit, the Jeep Patriot was added to Chrysler's ENVI lineup.

However, Chrysler's new partner Fiat SpA disbanded the ENVI division in November 2009, and removed the three ENVI models from its 5-year plan for Chrysler. There have been no announced plans to continue with the electric version.

2011 facelift

The Patriot received minor interior and exterior upgrades for 2011. The front fog lamps were shrunken and relocated, and the "Patriot" lettering on the rear bumper was removed and replaced with a more traditional rear bumper. Three trims were offered in the US: Sport, Latitude, and Limited (which replaced the earlier Latitude X). In Canada, North Edition replaced the Latitude trim with slightly different equipment.

In the EU, four trims were offered: Sport, Sport Plus, Limited, and an Overland version. In the EU market, the 2.0 L Volkswagen PD Diesel Engine was replaced by a 2.2 L Mercedes-Benz Twin-Cam Common Rail Diesel engine delivering .

For 2011, a 70th Anniversary Edition model was offered to commemorate the Jeep history. It was based on the Sport model with special olive or beige interior colors, unique alloy wheels, a nine-speaker Boston Acoustics premium sound system with subwoofer and fold-down liftgate speakers, Sirius XM Radio, a leather-wrapped steering wheel, leather seats, heated front seats, and other features. This model was available from May to October 2011.

For 2012 only, an Altitude Edition model, based on the Sport model, was offered. It featured black leather upholstery, special black-finished alloy wheels, a nine-speaker sound system, Sirius XM Radio, a leather-wrapped steering wheel, heated front seats, and black-painted exterior accents. This model started production in May 2012, and was only available for a few months.

For the 2013 model year, a Freedom Edition model, based on the Sport model, was offered to commemorate Jeep's commitment to the U.S. Army and military, as well to commemorate all of the soldiers who have served. It has a special star hood decal, power leather seats, a leather-wrapped steering wheel, Sirius XM Radio, and dark-finished alloy wheels.  This model features Commando Green Metallic exterior paint that is not available on other 2013 Jeep Patriots.

The Jeep Patriot underwent many changes in trims or models for the 2014 model year; however, 2014 was the first model year that Freedom Drive 1 Patriots came with a Hyundai 6-speed automatic transmission instead of the CVT.

Discontinuation
2017 was the last year for the Patriot, but production was discontinued in December 2016 (with the remainder of the fleet marketed as "2017" and sold until stock depletion). Both Patriot and first-generation Jeep Compass were replaced by second-generation Compass.

Safety

Insurance Institute for Highway Safety (IIHS)

*2007–2013 models with additional optional side airbags. Models without additional optional side airbags were rated Marginal.

NHTSA

Global sales

Notes

References

External links

 Official site
 Jeep Patriot Debut at Geneva Motor Show 
 Jeep Patriot Review Off Road Test
 Technical description of the Freedom Drive 4WD system

Patriot
Compact sport utility vehicles
Crossover sport utility vehicles
Vehicles with CVT transmission
All-wheel-drive vehicles
Front-wheel-drive vehicles
2010s cars
Cars introduced in 2006
Motor vehicles manufactured in the United States